"Cloud 9" is a song recorded by American rock band Beach Bunny. It was released on January 10, 2020 as the third single from their debut studio album Honeymoon. The song went viral on TikTok in March 2021, which caused it to enter charts in the United States, Canada, Ireland, and the United Kingdom. A remix featuring Canadian duo Tegan and Sara was released on April 16, 2021.

Composition
"Cloud 9" is the closing track on Honeymoon. It is described as "a surprisingly uptempo and motivational number" and "an undeniably giddy love song." The instrumentation is sparse throughout the verses, with guitars mixed low put focus on the drums and the "understated yet danceable bassline". The songs's Strokes-influenced bass solo "demonstrat[es] the band's natural cool even as they throw themselves into passion". In the song, Lili Trifilio sings about the highs of love against a simple indie pop hook, that turns into "a driving force of energy and enthusiasm" when her bandmates come crashing in for the chorus. Trifilo said of the song's lyrics, "I sought out to write a true, gushy, genuine love song when creating 'Cloud 9'. At the time I was at a questionable point in my relationship and I was reflecting on the last few years and how despite the ups and downs, love held us together. I hope that anyone who listens to this song can feel the love in the lyrics and give love a chance, as well as remember to always love themselves first and foremost."

Music video
The song was released with an official animated music video directed by Margaret Bialis. The video features a pink-haired girl who feels down in her luck, until a man appears with flowers, balloons, and "the type of happiness only love can prompt", while also singing to a crowd of snails.

Charts

Weekly charts

Year-end charts

Certifications

Release history

References

2020 singles
2020 songs
Beach Bunny (band) songs
Tegan and Sara songs